Alexander Stewart (c. 13751435) was a Scottish nobleman, Earl of Mar from 1404. He acquired the earldom through marriage to the hereditary countess, and successfully ruled the northern part of Scotland.

Biography
He was an illegitimate son of Alexander Stewart, Earl of Buchan, known as the Wolf of Badenoch, and probably Mairead inghean Eachainn.
 Alexander held the Earldom of Mar and the Lordship of the Garioch jure uxoris, in right of his first wife Isabel Douglas, Countess of Mar (died 1408). According to some sources, acquired by Alexander's rape of Isabel and murder of her husband, Sir Malcolm Drummond. In any event, Alexander's marriage to Isabella followed his capture of Kildrummy Castle, and Isabella with it, in 1404 after having attacked her husband, Sir Malcolm Drummond, brother-in-law of King Robert III, holding Sir Malcolm captive where he died. Thus, Isabel was forced to marry the man who murdered her husband and live the last four years of her life as a captive. Alexander forced her to execute a charter (12 August) settling the reversion to the earldom on himself and his heirs. This act she is believed to have revoked in September, but on marrying him, on 9 December 1404, she granted him the earldom for life, the king confirming this on 21 June 1405. These events shocked the kingdom and Alexander only escaped punishment because he was a close relation to the Royal Family. His possession of the Earldom was later regularized in 1424 by grant of his cousin, King James I.

He was a strong supporter of his uncle,Robert Stewart, Duke of Albany, who was then ruler of the kingdom as regent for his brother King Robert III of Scotland. Robert had been badly injured when he was kicked by his horse. Alexander led the so-called "Lowland" army, in fact that of the north-east and eastern Highlands, against Domhnall of Islay, Lord of the Isles, at the bloody and indecisive Battle of Harlaw in 1411, which Domhnall fought to gain his inheritance to the Earldom of Ross.

Unlike his father, Alexander Stewart, Earl of Buchan, aka "the Wolf of Badenoch", who had disturbed the peace in the fractious north-east, Alexander, Walter Bower says, "ruled with acceptance nearly all of the north of the country beyond the Mounth". He achieved this not by using different methods from his father but by his ability to keep his cateran forces in check and to use them to protect his extensive lands when needed; the result was that the lowland areas of Aberdeenshire and Moray were protected.

Alexander sat on the jury of 21 knights and peers that convicted his first cousin, Murdoch Stewart, Duke of Albany, and two of his sons of treason in 1424, leading to their execution and the virtual annihilation of the Stewarts of Albany.

Marriages and children
Alexander's first marriage was to Isabel Douglas, Countess of Mar (died 1408). Mar had seized his title by forced marriage to the countess following his capture of Kildrummy Castle in Aberdeenshire in 1404. These events shocked the kingdom and Alexander only escaped punishment because he was a close relation to the Royal Family. His possession of the Earldom was later regularized in 1424 by grant of his cousin, King James I. 

Alexander later married Marie van Hoorn, daughter of Willem, Lord of Duffel, in 1410. He died without a legitimate male heir and so the Earldom of Mar reverted to the crown.

He had two illegitimate children:
Thomas, who married Elizabeth, the widow of John Stewart, 2nd Earl of Buchan, who was daughter of Archibald Douglas, 4th Earl of Douglas and Margaret Stewart, Lady of Galloway
Margaret, who married Lachlan Maclean of Duart.

Notes

References
Boardman, Stephen I.,The Early Stewart Kings: Robert II and Robert III Edinburgh, Reprint 2007. 
 Grant, Alexander, "The Wolf of Badenoch" in W.D.H. Sellar (ed.), Moray: Province and People. Scottish Society for Northern Studies, Edinburgh, 1993. 
 Nigel Tranter, The Stewart Trilogy, Dunton Green, Sevenoaks, Kent: Coronet Books, 1986. . Lords of Misrule, 1388–1396. A Folly of Princes, 1396–1402. The Captive Crown, 1402–1411.

1370s births
1435 deaths

Year of birth uncertain
14th-century Scottish people
15th-century Scottish peers
15th-century Scottish military personnel
Children of peers and peeresses
Earls or mormaers of Mar
Alexander
Illegitimate branches of the House of Stuart
Peers jure uxoris
Scottish generals
Lords of Badenoch